The Return of the Condor Heroes, also called The Giant Eagle and Its Companion, is a wuxia novel by Jin Yong (Louis Cha). It is the second part of the Condor Trilogy and was preceded by The Legend of the Condor Heroes and followed by The Heaven Sword and Dragon Saber. It was first serialised between 20 May 1959 and 5 July 1961 in the Hong Kong newspaper Ming Pao.

The story revolves around the protagonist, Yang Guo, and his lover and martial arts master, Xiaolongnü, in their adventures in the jianghu (also called the wulin, the community of martial artists), where love between master and apprentice is seen as taboo. Jin Yong revised the novel in 1970 and again in 2004. There are 40 chapters in the second and third revisions. Each chapter has a title composed of four Chinese characters. Most of the revisions are either clarifications or minor alterations of character motivations or names. The Chinese title of the novel approximately translates to The Heroic Couple of the Godly Condor.

Plot
The protagonist, Yang Guo, is the orphaned son of Yang Kang, the antagonist in the previous novel. The couple Guo Jing and Huang Rong take care of Yang Guo for a short period of time before sending him to the Quanzhen School on Mount Zhongnan for better guidance in moral values and "orthodox" martial arts. In Quanzhen, Yang Guo is often picked on and bullied by his fellow students, and discriminated against by his master, Zhao Zhijing. Yang Guo flees from Quanzhen and ventures unknowingly into the nearby Tomb of the Living Dead, where the Ancient Tomb School is based. There, he meets Xiaolongnü, a mysterious maiden of unknown origin, and becomes her apprentice. They live together in the tomb for many years until Yang Guo grows up.

Yang Guo and Xiaolongnü develop romantic feelings for each other, but their romance is forbidden by the prevailing norms of the wulin (martial artists' community). Throughout the story, their love meets with several tests, such as the misunderstandings that threaten to tear them apart, and their encounter with Gongsun Zhi, whom Xiaolongnü almost marries at one point. Finally, after their reunion and marriage, Xiaolongnü leaves Yang Guo again, owing to her belief she cannot recover from a fatal poison and promises to meet him again 16 years later, to prevent him from committing suicide. While Yang Guo is wandering the wulin alone, he meets several formidable martial artists and a giant eagle, and improves his skills tremendously after learning from them. His adventures gradually mould him into a courageous hero and perhaps the most powerful martial artist of his time. Yang Guo serves his native land by helping the ethnic Han people of the Song Empire resist invaders from the Mongol Empire, killing Möngke Khan at the Battle of Xiangyang. At the end of the novel, he is reunited with Xiaolongnü and they leave to lead the rest of their lives in seclusion after receiving praises and blessings from the wulin.

Characters

Adaptations

Films

Television

Comics

Asiapac Books acquired the rights to produce an illustrated version of the novel in 1995. The 18 volume comic series was illustrated by Wee Tian Beng and translated by Jean Lim with Jin Yong's approval. The lavishly illustrated series won the Prestigious Award in 1997 during the Asian Comics Conference held in South Korea. Notable deviations from the main story include funny strips that poke gentle fun at some of the story's events, in line with conventions of the comic book medium. The series was repackaged in 2021 and Asiapac produced a new limited collector's edition of the comic in both English and Chinese.

In 2002 ComicsOne published the first official English translation of Legendary Couple, a retelling of the novel. The comic series was illustrated by Wong Yuk-long while Jin Yong was credited as the writer.

Video games
In 1997, Softworld released a RPG based on the novel for DOS. The game is only available in Chinese and covers the first half of the novel to the point where Yang Guo meets the Condor. In 2000, Interserv International Inc. published another video game adaptation using a 3D engine.

Music 
Fu Tong Wong composed an 8-movement symphony Symphony: The Hero with Great Eagle based on the novel.

References

 
1959 novels
20th-century Chinese novels
Novels by Jin Yong
Novels first published in serial form
Works originally published in Ming Pao
Novels set in the Southern Song
Novels set in Mongol Empire
Novels set in the 13th century
Sequel novels
Novels about orphans
Novels about revenge
Chinese novels adapted into television series
Chinese novels adapted into films
Novels adapted into comics
Novels adapted into video games
Novels set in Zhejiang
Novels set in Hubei